Polkadot cardinalfish is a common name for several fishes and may refer to:

Sphaeramia nematoptera
Sphaeramia orbicularis